Osmia ribifloris, one of several species referred to as a blueberry bee, is a megachilid bee native to western North America, including Oregon, California, Nevada, Utah, Arizona, New Mexico, Texas and northern Mexico. This solitary bee normally gathers pollen from plants in the family Ericaceae, with manzanita, Arctostaphylos sp. being a preferred host in the wild.  It will pollinate blueberries, and is sometimes used commercially for this purpose.

References

External links 
 Osmia ribifloris en Bugguide

ribifloris
Insects described in 1900